Namtar is a village development committee in Makwanpur District in the Narayani Zone of southern Nepal. At the time of the 1991 Nepal census it had a population of 7999 people living in 1331 individual households.
There are nine  in Namtar they are

References

Populated places in Makwanpur District